Enjoy Yourselves is a 1934 German musical comedy film directed by Hans Steinhoff and starring Dorit Kreysler, Ida Wüst and Wolfgang Liebeneiner. The film's sets were designed by the art directors Artur Günther and Benno von Arent. It premiered at the Ufa-Palast am Zoo in Berlin.

Synopsis
Gusti is a popular waitress until one of the customers complains and she loses her job at the restaurant. She accompanies a friend on a trip to the resort town Zugspitze in the Bavarian Alps where she encounters the customer again and seeks to get her revenge on him.

Cast
Dorit Kreysler as Gusti Melzer, waitress at "Bratwurstglöckl"
Ida Wüst as Camilla Raveck
Wolfgang Liebeneiner as Carl Maria
Leo Slezak as Gottfried Bumm, vocal pedagogue
Eugen Rex as Emil Weissberg
Anton Pointner as Igo von Lindstedt
Gertrud Wolle as Frau Senkpiel

References

Bibliography
 Rentschler, Eric. The Ministry of Illusion: Nazi Cinema and Its Afterlife. Harvard University Press, 1996.

External links

Films of Nazi Germany
German musical comedy films
1934 musical comedy films
Films directed by Hans Steinhoff
Films set in the Alps
UFA GmbH films
German black-and-white films
1930s German films